Sunlight at Secondhand is the second full-length album by Nights Like These, released on Victory Records. It has less of a heavy metal sound than its predecessor, The Faithless.

Critical reception
AllMusic wrote: "Fans of artier, complex bands like Neurosis and Isis will be able to latch on to the shifting textures and colors in the music, but people who just want to hear something heavy won't be disappointed, either."

Track listing
 Heart Of The Wound - 3:52
 Black The Sun - 3:47		
 Samsara - 4:04
 Bay Of Pigs - 4:43	
 Collective Unconscious - 4:08		
 Claw Your Way Out - 5:05
 Empty Lungs - 3:56			
 Veteran Thieves - 2:08			
 Electric Winds - 4:58			
 King - 4:44

Personnel
Billy Bottom - vocals
Matt Qualls - guitar
Patrick Leatherwood - drums
Derren Saucier - guitar
Sebastian Rios - bass guitar
Chris Owens - engineer

References

2007 albums
Nights Like These albums
Victory Records albums